Daniel Isaac J. Thornton (January 31, 1911 – January 18, 1976) was an American Republican politician who served as the 33rd governor of the state of Colorado from 1951 to 1955.

Biography
Daniel Isaac J. Thornton was born in Hall County, Texas, on January 31, 1911, and in 1929 he graduated from Lubbock High School in Lubbock, Texas. He was active in 4-H and was elected President of the Texas 4-H clubs in 1927.  Thornton attended (1929–30) Texas Technological College (now Texas Tech University) in Lubbock, attended the University of California at Los Angeles (UCLA) in 1932 and received Honorary Doctor's Degrees from Western State College in Gunnison, Colorado, in 1951 and Texas Technological College in 1953.

He married Jessie Willock, and they remained married until her death in 1972. In 1937, the Thorntons purchased a cattle ranch near Springerville in northeastern Arizona. In 1941, they moved their operation to a ranch in Gunnison County in southern Colorado. The Thorntons developed the Thornton Type, a strain of Hereford cattle. In 1948, Thornton was elected to the Colorado State Senate, a position that he held for only two years before becoming governor.

Political career
In 1950, Thornton defeated incumbent Democratic Governor Walter Walford Johnson. Thornton was known for his Stetson hat, pipe, and cowboy boots. He served as governor for two then two-year terms. As governor, he was instrumental in developing the U.S. Air Force Academy in Colorado Springs. In 1952 he was one of five people on the short list for consideration of the Republican vice presidential nomination. Dwight D. Eisenhower, like Thornton Texas-born, instead chose Richard Nixon, a freshman U.S. senator from California.

In 1956, Thornton was under discussion for a cabinet appointment. He was the Republican nominee for the U.S. Senate in Colorado that year, but was narrowly defeated by the Democrat John A. Carroll.

Death and legacy
Dan Thornton died of a heart attack in Carmel, California, on January 18, 1976, two weeks shy of his 65th birthday.

Governor Thornton is the namesake of the City of Thornton outside Denver, Colorado.  In 2008, he was listed among the "100 Most Influential People" from Lubbock, as part of the city centennial observation.

See also

 History of Colorado
 Law and government of Colorado
 List of governors of Colorado
 State of Colorado
 Thornton, Colorado

References

Further reading
 American Hereford Journal. Kansas City, Mo.: Hereford Publications.
 Daniel I. J. Thornton Manuscript Collection. Colorado Historical Society. Denver, Co.
 Daniel I. J. Thornton Newspaper Clippings Collection. Denver Public Library. Western History Collection. Denver, Co.
 Gunnison County Stockgrowers Since 1894 : Tops in Cattle. Denver, Co.: Colorado Cattlemen's Association, 1967.
 Preston, R.L., Ph.D.,  Stetson, Pipe and Boots, Colorado's Cattleman Governor, A Biography about Dan Thornton, Trafford Publishing, Victoria, B.C., 2006.

External links
 The Governors of Colorado
 The Governor Daniel I.J. Thornton Collection at the Colorado State Archives

|-

|-

|-

1911 births
1976 deaths
20th-century American politicians
Republican Party Colorado state senators
Republican Party governors of Colorado
People from Hall County, Texas
People from Lubbock, Texas
Ranchers from Colorado
Texas Tech University alumni
Thornton, Colorado
University of California, Los Angeles alumni
People from Springerville, Arizona